Vilayil Fazila is a Mappila songs singer from Kerala. Previously she was known as Vilayil Valsala prior to her conversion to Islam.

References

Year of birth missing (living people)
Living people
Converts to Islam
Mappilas
Singers from Kerala
Indian women singer-songwriters
Indian singer-songwriters
Kondotty area
Women musicians from Kerala